Getson is an English language surname. It is a variant of Jutson.

Notable people with this surname include:

 Carolyn Bolivar-Getson (born 1964), Canadian politician from Nova Scotia
 Shane Getson (born 1973), Canadian politician from Alberta

References 

Surnames
Patronymic surnames
English-language surnames
Surnames of English origin
Surnames of British Isles origin